PHX may refer to:

 A common abbreviation for the U.S. city of Phoenix, Arizona
 Phoenix Suns, the city's National Basketball Association team
 Phoenix Sky Harbor International Airport (IATA Airport Code PHX), the city's primary airport